Abraham ben Isaac of Granada  also Abraham Merimon was a Kabbalist of the thirteenth century.

Works
Abraham wrote:

A work on the Kabbala, under the title of Sefer ha-Berit. This is quoted by Moses Botarel in the introduction to his commentary on the Sefer Yeẓirah, which passage contains a reference to Maimonides' Moreh.
Another work on the Kabbala, under the title Berit Menuḥah, valued highly by Isaac Luria for its profound comments. Its language, as well as the manner in which Simon ben Yohai is introduced as speaker, shows striking resemblance to the Zohar, and it may be that the author had a larger version of the Zohar before him than is now extant. Unlike the Zohar however, Berit Menuḥah is primarily focused on practical Kabbalah and the powers of divine names.
A work entitled Megalle ha-Ta'alumot, quoted by the author in the work previously mentioned.

Jewish Encyclopedia bibliography
Adolf Jellinek, Auswahl Kabbalistischer Mystik, i.9 (German part);
Heimann Joseph Michael, Or ha-Ḥayyim, No. 146;
Isaac ben Jacob Benjacob, Oẓar ha-Sefarim, pp. 84, 86, 292.

References

Kabbalists
Clergy from Granada
13th-century rabbis in al-Andalus
Year of birth unknown
Year of death unknown